The 1988 HFC American Racing Series Championship consisted of 12 races.  Jon Beekhuis edged out Tommy Byrne for the championship by a mere 3 points, the closest margin in the series' 16 years. While Byrne won three races to Beekhuis' two, it was the consistent point scoring of Beekhuis that gave him the title.

Calendar

Note:

Race 12 abandoned after two laps due to an accident involving Michael Greenfield, Jeff Andretti and Guido Daccò and restarted.

Race summaries

Phoenix race
Held April 9 at Phoenix International Raceway. Jeff Andretti won the pole.

Top Five Results
 Paul Tracy
 Calvin Fish
 Wally Dallenbach Jr.
 Dave Simpson
 Ted Prappas

Milwaukee race
Held June 4 at The Milwaukee Mile. Dave Simpson won the pole.

Top Five Results
 Dave Simpson
 Mike Snow
 John McCracken
 Jon Beekhuis
 Brian Ongais

Portland race
Held June 19 at Portland International Raceway. Tommy Byrne won the pole.

Top Five Results
 Tommy Byrne
 Juan Manuel Fangio II
 Jon Beekhuis
 Paul Tracy
 Dave Simpson

Cleveland race
Held July 3 at Burke Lakefront Airport. Juan Manuel Fangio II won the pole.

Top Five Results
 Juan Manuel Fangio II
 Calvin Fish
 Dave Simpson
 Jon Beekhuis
 Guido Daccò

Toronto race
Held July 17 at Exhibition Place. Tommy Byrne won the pole.

Top Five Results
 Calvin Fish
 Tommy Byrne
 Guido Daccò
 Jon Beekhuis
 Ted Prappas

Meadowlands race
Held July 24 at the Meadowlands Sports Complex. Jon Beekhuis won the pole.

Top Five Results
 Jon Beekhuis
 Dave Simpson
 Tommy Byrne
 Ted Prappas
 Calvin Fish

Pocono race
Held August 20 at Pocono Raceway. Dave Simpson won the pole.

Top Five Results
 Michael Greenfield
 Tommy Byrne
 Dave Simpson
 Juan Manuel Fangio II
 Ted Prappas

Mid-Ohio race
Held September 4 at The Mid-Ohio Sports Car Course. Jon Beekhuis won the pole.

Top Five Results
 Jon Beekhuis
 Tommy Byrne
 Ted Prappas
 Gary Rubio
 Paul Tracy

Elkhart Lake race
Held September 11 at Road America. Calvin Fish won the pole.

Top Five Results
 Juan Manuel Fangio II
 Jon Beekhuis
 Ted Prappas
 Gary Rubio
 Mike Groff

Nazareth race
Held September 25 at Nazareth Speedway. Calvin Fish won the pole.

Top Five Results
 Calvin Fish
 Mike Groff
 Mike Snow
 Dave Simpson
 Jon Beekhuis

Laguna Seca race
Held October 16 at Mazda Raceway Laguna Seca. Juan Manuel Fangio II won the pole.

Top Five Results
 Tommy Byrne
 Jon Beekhuis
 Juan Manuel Fangio II
 Gary Rubio
 Mike Snow

Miami race
Held November 6 at Tamiami Park. Juan Manuel Fangio II won the pole.

Top Five Results
 Tommy Byrne
 Juan Manuel Fangio II
 Calvin Fish
 Gary Rubio
 Jon Beekhuis

Final points standings

Driver

For every race the points were awarded: 20 points to the winner, 16 for runner-up, 14 for third place, 12 for fourth place, 10 for fifth place, 8 for sixth place, 6 seventh place, winding down to 1 points for 12th place. Additional points were awarded to the pole winner (1 point) and to the driver leading the most laps (1 point).

Complete Overview

R16=retired, but classified

References

Indy Lights seasons
American Racing Series Season, 1988
American Racing